The Urban Community of Bordeaux Public Transport System (Keolis) manages 65 regular bus and tram lines in Bordeaux Métropole.  These tram and bus lines comprise:
 13 high frequency (10–15 minute) services (LIANES)
 9 main lines which have a service frequency from 15 to 30 minutes
 6 suburban services (COROL)
 8 local services (CITÉIS)
 2 express services
 16 lower frequency services
 11 special services (e.g. school services)
 4 Day Flexo (flexible services which follow fixed routes to a location and then pick up or set down on demand in that location)
 6 Evening Flexo (flexible services which follow fixed routes to a location and then pick up or set down on demand in that location)
 1 Night Flexo (flexible services which follow fixed routes to a location and then pick up or set down on demand in that location)
 3 Résago areas (demand responsive services which serve areas with little or no coverage by the normal bus or tram services).

This network commenced operation on 22 February 2010.

LIANES

LIgne A Niveau Elevé de Service (line with high level of service)
These 13 lines constitute with the tram, the main axes of the network. They function from 5 am to midnight or 1 am with a 10- to 15-minute fréquency between 7 am and 8 pm, with an identical service the Saturday morning and a connection to 2 lines of tram.

 Urban area map (format pdf)
 City-center map (format pdf)
 Evening network map (format pdf)

Main lines

The main lines have a frequency from 15 to 30 minutes. They function from 6 am to 9 pm.

 Urban area map (format pdf)
 City-center map (format pdf)

COROL

These 6 lines connect the peripheric city without passing by the center of Bordeaux. They function from 6 am to 9 pm.

 Urban area map (format pdf)
 City-center map (format pdf)

CITÉIS
The 8 Citéis are proximity lines, which connect districts of the same city. Citéis 42, 45 and 46 circulate in loop with double direction, with only one terminus. Citéis 47 "the Electric Shuttle" crosses the small streets of the downtown area : it doesn't have any precise stop, the bus stops only when passengers request. They have a frequency of 20 to 60 minutes. They function from 6:30 am to 8 pm.

 Urban area map (format pdf)
 City-center map (format pdf)

Express lines
Alternatives Express from LIANE 6.

 Urban area map (format pdf)
 City-center map (format pdf)

Local lines
Local lines have a frequency from 30 to 45 minutes. They function from 6:30 am to 8 pm.

 Urban area map (format pdf)
 City-center map (format pdf)

Spécific lines

The specific lines serve some schools and function only in school period.

 Schedules and Map (format pdf)

FleXO
They have a regular frequency. They have a route fix which leads in a geographical area. In these zones, there are stops served automatically and stops on request.
There exists 4-day Flexo, 6 evenings and 1 night connecting the district of the nightclub to the university campus from 1:50 am to 4:45 am from Thursday to Saturday.

Day Flexo :

Monday to Friday :

Saturday :

Sunday :

 Flexo 48 (format pdf)
 Flexo 49 (format pdf)
 Flexo 38 + Résago Bouliac (format pdf)
 Flexo 68 + Résago Artigues (format pdf)

Evening Flexo :

 Evenning network map (format pdf)
 Dépliant Evening and Night Flexo (format pdf)

Night Flexo :

 Plan du réseau Soirée (format pdf)
 Dépliant Flexo de Soirée et de Nuit (format pdf)

ResaGO

To supplement these lines, on the cities of Le Taillan-Medoc, Bouliac and Artigues-près-Bordeaux is set up Résago. This service of Demand responsive transport makes it possible to serve zones little or not covered by the traditional lines of bus or tram. This service requires a preliminary telephone reservation, until the day before 7pm. The Résago vehicle leads then the passengers of a point given to a bus or tram stop. This service costs the price of a normal ticket of TBC.

Monday to Saturday :

Monday to Friday :

Sunday :

 Dépliant Flexo 38 + Résago Bouliac (format pdf)
 Dépliant Flexo 68 + Résago Artigues (format pdf)
 Dépliant Résago Le Taillant (format pdf)

Public transport in Bordeaux
Gironde

de:Tram et Bus de la Communauté Urbaine de Bordeaux
it:Tram et Bus de la Communauté Urbaine de Bordeaux